John J. "Red" McManus (January 30, 1925 – July 23, 2013)  was an American basketball coach best known for his tenure as head coach at Creighton University.

McManus, who attended St. Ambrose Academy (now Assumption High School) and St. Ambrose University in Davenport, Iowa, coached his high school alma mater from 1950 to 1958.  After a year as an assistant at Iowa, McManus was named head coach and athletic director at Creighton in Omaha, Nebraska.  He led the Bluejays to a 138–118 record from 1959 to 1969 and took the program to the NCAA Tournament appearances in 1962 and 1964.

McManus died on July 23, 2013 under hospice care in Omaha. He was 88.

References

1925 births
2013 deaths
American men's basketball coaches
Basketball coaches from Iowa
College men's basketball head coaches in the United States
Creighton Bluejays athletic directors
Creighton Bluejays men's basketball coaches
High school basketball coaches in the United States
Iowa Hawkeyes men's basketball coaches
Sportspeople from Davenport, Iowa
St. Ambrose Fighting Bees baseball players